is a variety of silk cloth produced in Japan, chiefly in  in  Prefecture. It is designated as one of the Important Intangible Cultural Properties of Japan, and has also been inscribed on the UNESCO Representative List of the Intangible Cultural Heritage of Humanity.

History
The traditional history of  traces its origin to a crafthouse known as  during the reign of the legendary Emperor  Knowledge of the method of silk production, developed by its founder, was said to have immediately spread out to the  district and beyond.

Another account identified the  period (14th-16th century) as the period when  was developed. It is said that the feudal lord of a farmer family in the Hitachi Province sent  fabric to a governor called  every year as a gift.

Developing from earlier silk techniques, the name  was adopted in 1602.

In 1873,  was exhibited at the 1873 Vienna World's Fair, and became known worldwide.

Production method
To produce the fabric, silk floss is first extracted from silkworm cocoons and is spun by hand into yarn. The technique involves a tedious process of manually tying thousands of resists before the yarn is dyed, based on the desired resulting pattern or design. The strap around the weaver's waist enables the tension of the vertical thread to be adjusted. It can take up to fifteen days to weave enough plain fabric for an adult garment, and up to forty-five days for patterned fabric.

Cultural Heritage
In 1956,  was designated one of the Important Intangible Cultural Properties of Japan. The  was established in 1976 and helps promote and transmit the craft.  High School in  has a  club. In 2010,  was inscribed on the Representative List of the Intangible Cultural Heritage of Humanity.

See also
Sericulture

Important Intangible Cultural Properties of Japan
National Treasures of Japan - Dyeing and Weaving
Representative List of the Intangible Cultural Heritage of Humanity

References

External links
UNESCO nomination document

Culture in Ibaraki Prefecture
Important Intangible Cultural Properties of Japan
Intangible Cultural Heritage of Humanity
Japanese words and phrases
Silk
Textile-related meibutsu